This is a list of characters who have appeared on the soap opera Guiding Light.

A

Sunny Adelman
Fay Wolf (2000)

Gus Aitoro (deceased)
Ricky Paull Goldin (2001–2008)

Brad Andrews
Brendan Wentworth (1997–1998)

Leslie Ann Andrews
Carolyn Ann Clark (1981–1984)

Warren Andrews
Warren Burton (1983–1987)

Eleni Andros
see Eleni Andros Cooper

Eden August
Teresa Hill (2002–2003)
Deborah Zoe (2003–2004)

Madame Ava
Marian Seldes (1998)

B

Wally Bacon
Jack Armstrong (1985)

Clarence Bailey
Philip Bosco (1979)
Larry Weber (1982)
District Attorney.

Diane Ballard (deceased)
Sofia Landon Geier (1977–1981)

Eddie Banks
Robert Leeshock (1998)

Bruce Banning 
Les Damon (1952; 1956–1960)

Susan Bates Spaulding
Nancy Bell (1995–1996)

Bertha "Bert" Bauer (deceased)
Ann Shepard (1949–1950)
Charita Bauer (1950–1984)

Bill Bauer (deceased)
Lyle Sudrow (1952–1959)
Ed Bryce (1959–1963; 1965–1969; 1977–1978; 1983)
Eugene Smith (1964)

Ed Bauer
Pat Collins (1954–1961)
Robert Gentry (1966–1969; 1997–1998)
Mart Hulswit (1969–1981)
Peter Simon (1981–1984; 1986–1996; 2002–2004; 2009)
Richard Van Vleet (1984–1986)

Maureen Reardon Bauer (deceased)
Ellen Dolan (1982–1986)
Ellen Parker (1986–93; 1997–2000; 2004–05)

Friedrich "Papa" Bauer (deceased)
Theodore von Eltz (1948–1949)
Theo Goetz (1949–1973)

Gertrude "Trudy" Bauer
Laurette Fillbrant (1948–1949)
Charlotte Holland (1949–1951)
Helen Wagner (1952)
Lisa Howard (1957–1958)

Hillary Bauer (deceased)
Linda McCullough (1977–1978)
Marsha Clark (1978–1984)

Hope Bauer 
Jennifer Kirschner (1963–1965)
Paula Schwartz (1968)
Elisa Leeds (1968–1973)
Tisch Raye (1975–1976)
Robin Mattson (1976–1977)
Katherine Justice (1977)
Elvera Roussel (1979–1983)

Jack Bauer 
Alan North (1988)

Johnny Bauer 
James Goodwin (1986–1990)

Jude Cooper Bauer
Aaron Hart (2005–2007)
Robert Danza, Jr (2007–2008)

Lacey Bauer 
Zoe Trilling (1987–1988)

Lanie Bauer 
Teri Keane (1988)

Leah Bauer
Marley Wright (2004)
Arielle Renwart (2006–2008)
Tyra Colar (2008–2009)

"Mama" Bauer (deceased)
Gloria Brandt (1948–1949)
Adelaide Klein (1949)

Meta Bauer
Gloria Blondel (1948)
Dorothy Lovett (1948–1949)
Jone Allison (1949–1952)
Ellen Demming (1952–1974)
Mary Stuart (1996–2002)

Michelle Bauer Santos
Anna Tendler (1985–1988) 
Rachel Miner (1989–1995)
Rebecca Budig (1995–1998)
Bethany Joy Lenz (1998–2000)
Nancy St. Alban (2000–2005; 2009)

Mike Bauer
Glenn Walken & Christopher Walken (1954–1956)
Michael Allen (1957–1961)
Paul Prokopf (1962–1963)
Gary Pilar (1963–1965)
Robert Pickering (1968)
Don Stewart (1968–1984; 1997)

Rick Bauer
Albert Zungolo  III (1970–1971)
Gary Hannoch (1972–1976)
Robbie Berridge (1976–1978)
Phil MacGregor (1982–1983)
Michael O'Leary (1983–1986; 1987–1991; 1995–2009)

Helene Benedict
Kay Campbell (1957–1964)

Henry Benedict
John Gibson (1958–1960)
John Boruff (1962–1966)
Lester Rawlins (1967)
Paul McGrath (1967)

Jack Blue
John Doman (1997)

Jesse Blue
Paulo Benediti (1997–2000)

Abigail Blume
Amy Ecklund (1995–2000)

Christina Boudreau
Karla Mosley (2008–2009)

Clayton Boudreau 
Peter Francis James (2003–2009)

Felicia Boudreau
Kim Brockington (2002–2009)
Doctor.

Remy Boudreau
Corey Parker Robinson (2001–2002)
Gavin Houston (2002–2005)
Lawrence Saint-Victor (2006–2009)

Alex Bowden
Ernest Graves (1963–1966)

Cooper Bradshaw (deceased)
Michael Cugno (1996–1997)
Christopher and Nicholas Consolo (1997–1998)
Zachary Noll (1999–2000)
John Driscoll (2004–2009)

Jenna Bradshaw (deceased)
Fiona Hutchison (1992–1994; 1996–1998; 2006; 2009)

Joel Brooks
Charles Baxter (1954–1955)

Michael Burke
Peter Hermann (1997–1998)
Doctor.

C

Julie Camaletti
Jocelyn Seagrave (1991–1994)

Wally Campbell
Jack Ryland (1969)
Lieutenant

Anthony James "J." Chamberlain
James Anthony Nielsen (1984–1985)
George Pilgrim (1996)
Ethan Erickson (1996–1998; 2009)

Henry Chamberlain (deceased)
William Roerick (1980–1995)

Nola Chamberlain
Lisa Brown (1980–1985; 1995–1998; 2009)

Quinton Chamberlain
Michael Tylo (1981–1985; 1996–1997)
Josh Taylor (1997)

Vanessa Chamberlain
Maeve Kinkead (1980–1987; 1989–2000; 2002; 2005–2009)

Pam Chandler
Maureen Silliman (1974–1976)

Max Chapman
Ben Hammer (1977–1978)

Peter Chapman
Curt Dawson (1977–1980)

Brandon Cohen
Kevin Collins (2008–2009)

Rebecca Collier
Ellen Holly (1989-1993)
Judge

Jack Conroy
Tony Craig (1986)
Senator

Linell Conway
Christina Pickles (1970–1972)

Buzz Cooper
Justin Deas (1993-2009)

Frank Cooper Jr.
Frank Dicopoulos (1987–2009)

Eleni Andros Cooper
Melina Kanakaredes (1991–1995)
Wendy Kaplan (1994–1995)
Jennifer Roszell (1995–2002; 2006–2009)

Harley Cooper
Beth Ehlers (1987–1993; 1997–2008)

Lucy Cooper
Sonia Satra (1993–1997; 1998; 2006–2007)

Marina Cooper
Casey Rosenhaus (1993–1994)
Alysia Zucker (1994–1996)
Sasha Martin (1996–2000)
Aubrey Dollar (2001–2004)
Kit Paquin (2004)
Mandy Bruno (2004–2009)

Nadine Cooper (deceased)
Jean Carol (1988–1995; 2003; 2006)

Rich Cosner
Kevin Collins (2006–2007)

Dahlia Crede
Sharon Leal (1996–1999)

Silas Crocker
Benjamin Hendrickson (1982)

Carrie Curruthers
Carrie Nye (2003–2006)

Patrick Cutter
Scott Hoxby (1993–1995)

D

Louie Darnell
Eric Brooks (1983–1986)
Doctor

Selena Davis
Patti D'Arbanville (1998–2000)

Suzanne Deveraux
Juliet Pritner (1991–1992)

Sidney "Sid" Dickerson
Kelly Neal (1994–1995)

Keith Driscoll
Ed Moran (2007)

Annie Dutton
Cynthia Watros (1994–1998)
Signy Coleman (1998–1999; 2003)

E

Betty Eiler
Madeleine Sherwood (1971–1972)

Charles Eiler
Graham Jarvis (1971–1972)

Einstein
Ian Alda (2007)

Mark Evans
Mark Pinter (1981–1983)

Nell Everest
Patrick O'Connell (1989–1990)

F

Andy Ferris
Victor Slezak (1984–1985)

Fred Fletcher
John Gibson (1958)
Dr. Paul Fletcher's biological father.

Johnny Fletcher
Don Scardino (1965–1967)
Erik Howell (1967–1972)

Paul Fletcher
Michael Kane (1956)
Bernard Grant (1956–1979)
Fred Fletcher's biological son. Doctor

Leo Flynn
Robert LuPone (1990-2000)

Cyrus Foley
Murray Bartlett (2007–2009)

Carlo Fontini
James Coco (1986–1987)

Sandy Foster
Scott Bailey (2003–2006)

Whitney Foxton
Joseph Maher (1978–1979)

Jim Frazier
Billy Dee Williams (1966)
James Earl Jones (1966–1967)
Doctor

Martha Frazier
Ruby Dee (1967)

Jackson Freemont
Michael Wilding Jr. (1985–1987)

G

Doug Gandil
Vic Noto (1981)

Verne Garrison
Barbara Meek (1992)

Sally Gleason
Patricia Barry (1985–1987)

Georgene Belmont Granger
Delphi Harrington (1976–1978)

Malcolm Granger
Ed Seamens (1976)

Laura Ashley Grant
Katherine N. Anderson (1953)
Alice Yourman (1953–1956)

Charles Grant
David Fonteno (1995–2000; 2002; 2003; 2004; 2006)
Doctor.

David Grant
Monti Sharp (1992–1995)
Russell Curry (1995–1996)
Terrell Tilford (1998–2001)

Dick Grant
James Lipton (1953)
Doctor.

Gillian "Gilly" Grant
Amelia Marshall (1989–1996)

Kathy Grant
Susan Douglas Rubeš (1952–1958)

Richard Grant
Ed Prentiss (1953)

Vivian Grant
Petronia Paley (1992–1997)

Brad Green
Michael Swan (2003)
Mark Pinter (2003–2004)

Joe Green
John Rothman (2007–2009)
Judge.

Eve Guthrie (deceased)
Hilary Edson (1992–1995)
Doctor

H

Greta Halsey
Elizabeth Swados (1993; 1999)

Noelle Hamilton
Elaina Erika Davis (2002)

Richard Hanley
Mandel Kramer (1953)
District Attorney.

Sid Harper
Philip Sterling (1952–1954)

Chuck Haskell
Peter Gallagher (1979)

Jack Haskell
Paul Larson (1966)

George Hayes
Philip Sterling (1963–1968)

Ramona Herndon
Colleen Dion (2003)

Adrian "Sugar" Hill
Taye Diggs (1997)

Tangie Hill
Marcy Walker (1993–1995)

Wanda Hite
Carey Cromelin (2009)

Alice Holden
Sandy Dennis (1956)
Diane Gentner (1956–1958)
Lin Pearson (1958–1959)

Mark Holden
Whitfield Connor (1955–1961)

Charlie Hubbs
Jabari Gray (2006)
Police detective.

Luke Huff
John Lavelle (2004)

Sebastian Hulce
Doug Hutchison (2004–2005)

I

J

Stephen Jackson
Stefan Schnabel (1966–1981)
Doctor.

Drew Jacobs
Tammy Blanchard (1997–2000)

Karl Jannings
Richard Morse (1959)

Will Jefferies
Joseph Breen (1987–1989)

Brenda Jensen
Linda Cook (2003)

Hart Jessup (deceased)
Jeff Phillips (1991–1992)
Leonard Stabb (1993)
Sean McDermott (1993)
Marshall Hilliard (1995–1996)
Frank Grillo (1996–1999)

R.J. Jessup
Alex Beck (1998–2003)
Christian Kulp (2003–2004)
Miles Williams (2004–2008)

Janet Johnson
Ruth Warrick (1953–1954)
Lois Wheeler (1954–1956; 1957–1958)
Registered Nurse.

Dana Jones
Katell Pleven (1989–1990)

Harry Jones
Mark Margolis (1994)

K

Paul Keeler
Ed Begley (1952)
Mel Ruick (1953)
Reverend and Doctor.

Jim Kelly
Paul Potter (1954)
Doctor.

Helen Kennedy
Nancy Pinkerton (1985)

Karen Kennedy
Sharon Washington (1992)

Jack Kiley
Tom Tammi (1992)

Sheila Kiley
Kristine Sutherland (1992)

Dante "Pops Cooper" Kouperakis
Vince O'Brien (1995–2009)

Stavros Kouperakis
Eugene Troobnick (1991–1995)

L

Paul La Crosse
Jacques Roux (1977–1981)
Doctor

Duke Lafferty
G. Rockett Phillips (1980–1981)

Robin Lang
Zina Bethune (1958)

Christopher Langham
Russ Anderson (2003–2004)

Laverne Larkin
Rebecca Damon (2008–2009)

Jeremy Larson
Greg McFadden (2006–2009)

Brent Lawrence
Frank Beaty (1995–1996)

Rob Layne
Timothy Adams (2000)

Daisy Lemay
Brittany Slattery (1989, 1994)
Brittany Snow (1998–2001)
Bonnie Dennison (2007–2009)

Jim Lemay
Anthony Addabbo (1999–2000)

Bill Lewis III
Renald White (1984–1986)
Bryan Buffington (1989–1998)
Ryan Brown (1998–2001)
Daniel Cosgrove (2002–2005; 2007–2009)

Billy Lewis II
Jordan Clarke (1983–1986; 1989–1993; 1996–1998; 1999–2009)
Geoffrey Scott (1993–1994)

Dylan Lewis
Morgan Englund (1989–1995; 1997; 1999; 2002; 2004, 2006; 2009)
Brian Gaskill (2007–2008)
Son of Reva Shayne and Billy Lewis

H.B. Lewis (deceased)
Larry Gates (1983–1996)

Henry Lewis

Joshua "Josh" Lewis
Robert Newman (1981–1984; 1986–1991; 1993–2009)

Marah Lewis
Nicole Otto (1987–1988)
Ashley Peldon (1989–1991)
Kimberly J. Brown (1993–1998; 2006)
Lauren C. Mayhew (1998–1999)
Laura Bell Bundy (1999–2001)
Lindsey McKeon (2001–2004)

Max Lewis

Mindy Lewis
Krista Tesreau (1983–1989; 2004; 2006, 2009)
Kimberley Simms (1989–1992; 1997)
Ann Hamilton (1993)
Barbara Crampton (1993–1995)

Patricia "Trish" Lewis
Rebecca Hollen (1980–1984)

Shayne Lewis
Travis Cartier (1990–1991)
Bret Cooper (1993–1997)
Garrett Stevens (1997–1999)
Tony Michael Donnelly (1999)
Billy Kay (2000–2003)
Marty West (2003–2004)
Jeff Branson (2008–2009)

Ernie Logan
Brett Rigby (2007–2009)

Brandon "Lujack" Luvonaczek (deceased)
Vincent Irizarry (1983–1986; 1989)

Eric Luvonaczek
Ted Sorel (1991–1992)

M

A.C. Mallet
Mark Derwin (1990–1993)
Robert Bogue (2005–2009)

Blake Marler
Gina Foy (1975–1978)
Cheryl Lynn Brown (1979–1980)
Elizabeth Dennehy (1988–1989)
Sherry Stringfield (1989–1992)
Elizabeth Keifer (1992–2009)
Wife of Ross Marler. Daughter of Roger Thorpe and Holly Norris Reade. Also known as Christina/Chrissy.

Clarissa Marler
Arielle Fleischer (2006–2008)
Naelee Rae (2008–2009)

Dinah Marler
Jennifer Gatti (1986–1987)
Paige Turco (1987–1989)
Wendy Moniz (1995–1999)
Gina Tognoni (2004–2009)
Daughter of Ross Marler and Vanessa Chamberlain.

Elaine "Lanie" Marler
Katheen Kellaigh (1979–1981)

Jason Marler
Samantha Stein (1996)
Cody Arens (1998)
James & Michael Mackonockie (1998–2002)
Ryan Marsini (2002)
James Kukinski (2002)
Mick Hazen (2006)

Justin Marler
Thomas O'Rourke (1976–1983)
Christopher Pennock (1990–1991)

Kevin Marler
Brandon Unger (1996)
Isabelle Farrell (1996–1998)
Brett & Shane Harder (1998–2002)
Jeffrey Scaperrotta (2002–2005)
Eric Nelsen (2006)

Ross Marler (deceased)
Jerry Ver Dorn (1979–2005)
Husband of Blake.

Samantha Marler
Suzy Cote (1989–1992)

Karen Martin
Tudi Wiggins (1971–1972)

Grove Mason
Vince O'Brien (1967–1970, 1989–1990)

Sean McCullough
William Bumiller (1998–1999)

Eve McFarren
Janet Grey (1976–1982)

Dr. Sara McIntyre
Patricia Roe (1967–1968)
Jill Andre (1968)
Millette Alexander (1969–1983)

Rose McLaren
Alexandra Neil (1987–1989)

Deborah Mehren
Olivia Cole (1969–1971)

Jeffrey Morgan
Ramy Zaza (1997–1998)

Joe Morrison
Daniel von Bargen (1993)

Andrew Murray
Dana Elcar (1962)
District Attorney

N

Natasha
BethAnn Bonner (2009)

Rebecca Nash
Christopher Norris (1992)

Kelly Nelson
John Wesley Shipp (1980–1984)

Ira Newton
Sorrell Booke (1972)
District Attorney

Max Nickerson
Jesse Lee Soffer (1999)
Paul Wesley (1999–2000)

Nolan
Stephen Zinnato (2001–2004)

Bonnie Noonan
Julie Potter (1991–1995)

Andrew "Andy" Norris
Barney McFadden (1975; 1996–1999; 2003–2006)
Ted Le Plat (1980–1981)

Barbara Norris
Augusta Dabney (1970–1971)
Barbara Berjer (1971–1981; 1995–1996)

Holly Norris Reade
Lynn Deerfield (1970–1976)
Maureen Garrett (1976–1980; 1988–2006; 2009)

Kenneth Norris
Roger Newman (1970–1972; 1973–1975; 1998–1999)

Stanley "Stan" Norris
Michael Higgins (1970)

O

Carroll O'Malley
Will Lyman (1995)

Colin O'Neill
Chase & Trevor Tonon (2009)

Jeffrey O'Neill
Bradley Cole (2003–2009)
T.J. Linnard (2006)

Sir Clayton Olds
Miles Easton (1973–1974)
British Psychiatrist

P

Trudy Palmer
Helen Wagner (1952)

Floyd Parker
Tim Nielsen (1980–1985)

Katie Parker
Denise Pence (1977–1985)

Ava Peralta
Michelle Ray Smith (2005–2008; 2009)

Dan Peters
Paul Ballantyne (1954)

Susan Piper
Carrie Nye (1984)

Susan Prescott
Casey Hutchison (1960–1985)

Q

Catalina Quesada
Jessica Jimenez (2000–2002)

Quinn
Neal Bledsoe (2005)

R

Beth Raines
Judi Evans (1983–1986)
Beth Chamberlin (1989–1991; 1997–2009)

Bradley Raines
James Rebhorn (1983–1985; 1989)

Lillian Raines
Tina Sloan (1983–2009)
Registration Nurse.

Claire Ramsey
Susan Pratt (1983–1986; 2000–2002)

Jonathan Randall
Sean Rademaker (1999–2000)
Tom Pelphrey (2004–2009)

Sarah Randall
Alexa Kaplan (2009)

Ben Reade (deceased)
Geoffrey Burke (1989–1996)
Matthew Bomer (2001–2003)

Fletcher Reade
Jay Hammer (1984–1998; 1999; 2009)

Bea Reardon
Lee Lawson (1980–1985; 1986; 1987–1988; 1990)

Bridget Reardon
Melissa Hayden (1991–1997; 2009)

Chelsea Reardon
Kassie DePaiva (1986–1991)

Jim Reardon
Michael Woods (1983–1985)

Matt Reardon
Kurt McKinney (1994–2000; 2005; 2006–2009)

Maureen Reardon
Noel & Natalie Chant (2000)
Jaycie Megan Cohen (2000)
Olivia Dicopoulos (2009)

Nola Reardon
Lisa Brown (1980–1985; 1995–1998; 2009)

Tony Reardon
Gregory Beecroft (1981–1985)

Peggy Ashley Regan
Patricia Wheel (1953–1955)

Dalton Reid
Matt Walton (2008)

Carl Richards
Wayne Tippit (1974)
Doctor

Jennifer Richards
Geraldine Court (1982)

Morgan Richards (Nelson)
Kristen Vigard (1980–1981)
Jennifer Cooke (1981–1983)

Natalia Rivera
Jessica Leccia (2007–2009)

Joe Roberts
Herbert Nelson	(1952–1955)

Rae Rooney
Allison Daugherty (1989–1990)

Tim Ryan
Jordan Clarke (1974–1976)
Doctor

S

Vinnie Salerno
John Fiore (2002–2008)

Kyle Sampson
Larkin Malloy (1985–1987)

Wyatt Sanders
Keith Christopher (1995–1996)

Carmen Santos
Saundra Santiago (1999–2000; 2001–2003)

Danny Santos
Paul Anthony Stewart (1998–2005; 2009)

Hope Santos
Cally and Brooke Tarleton (2005)
Lucy Palubo (2009)

Maria Santos
Míriam Colón (2001)

Mick Santos
Juan Carlos Hernández (1998)

Michelle Bauer Santos
Bethany Joy Lenz (1998–2000)
Nancy St. Alban (2000–2005, 2009)

Pilar Santos
Paula Garces (1999–2001)

Ray Santos
Jaime Passer (1999)
George Alvarez (1999–2009)

Robbie Santos
Joshua and Julia Ladd (2001–2002)
Jack O'Rourke (2002–2003)
Patrick Gilbert (2003–2005; 2009)

Tony Santos (deceased)
Jordi Vilasuso (2000–2003)
Stephen Martines (2003–2005)

Ben Scott
Bernard Kates (1965–1968)

Emmett Scott
Kenneth Harvey (1976)
Frank Latimore (1976–1979)
Doctor.

Margaret Sedwick
Margaret Gwenver (1982–2007)
Doctor

Hawk Shayne
Gil Rogers (1985–1990; 1995–1999; 2002; 2004; 2006)

Reva Shayne
Kim Zimmer (1983–1990; 1995–2009)

Roxie Shayne
Kristi Ferrell (1984–1988)

Sarah Shayne
Audrey Peters (1987–1991; 1993; 2006)

Sheila Slye
Kate Miller (2008)

Zachary Smith
Brody Hutzler (1996–1997)

Soto
Nick Santino (2002)
Reverend.

Alan Spaulding (deceased)
Chris Bernau (1977–1984; 1986–1988)
Wayne Tippit (1982, temporary replacement)
Daniel Pilon (1988–1989; 1990)
Ron Raines (1994–2009)

Alan-Michael Spaulding
Jessica Zutterman (1981–1983)
Carl T. Evans (1987–1990)
Rick Hearst (1990–1996)
Michael Dietz (1996–1997)
Michael Dempsey (2005–2007)

Alexandra Spaulding
Lydia Bruce (1984)
Beverlee McKinsey (1984–1992)
Marj Dusay (1993–1997; 1998–1999; 2002–2009)
Joan Collins (2002)

Amanda Spaulding
Kathleen Cullen (1978–1983; 1987)
Toby Poser (1995–1998)

Brandon Spaulding (deceased)
Ralph Bell (1983)

Emma Spaulding
Kathryn Hall (2006–2007)
Jacqueline Tsirkin (2007–2009)

James Spaulding
Desmond and Aidan Young (2000–2001)
Caleb Collins (2001–2008)
Zack Conroy (2009)

Lizzie Spaulding
Julie Levine (1990–1991)
Hayden Panettiere (1996–2000)
MacKenzie Mauzy (2000–2002)
Allison Hirschlag (2002–2003)
Crystal Hunt (2003–2006)
Marcy Rylan (2006–2009)

Nick McHenry Spaulding
Vincent Irizarry (1991–1996; 1998)

Peyton Spaulding

Phillip Spaulding
Jarrod Ross (1977–1981)
Grant Aleksander (1982–1984; 1986–1991; 1996–2004; 2005; 2009)
John Bolger (1985–1986)

Victoria "Vicky" Spaulding
Victoria Platt (1998–2000)

Zach Spaulding
Connor and Keegan Sinclair (1999–2002; recurring)
Nicholas Art (2002–2008; recurring)

Hampton Speakes
Vince Williams (1989–1996)

Kathryn "Kat" Speakes
Nia Long (1991–1994)

Olivia Spencer
Crystal Chappell (1999–2009)

Daniel St. John
David Bishins (1990–1992)

Logan Stafford
Richard Hamilton (1981)

Eve Stapleton-McFerron
Janet Grey (1976–1983)

Rita Stapleton-Bauer
Lenore Kasdorf (1975–1981)

Viola Stapleton
Sudie Bond (1976)
Kate Wilkinson (1976–1981)

Cameron Stewart
Ian Ziering (1986–1988)

Maeve Stoddard
Leslie Denniston (1985–1988)

Gavin "The Mole" Strong
Geoffrey Arend (2003)

Ralphie Sullivan
Lee Reherman (2000)

Jack Summers
John Behlmann (2007)

Gary Swanson
William Bell Sullivan (1989–1990)

T

Johnny "Dub" Taylor
Marko Maglich (1984–1985)

Bart Thompson
Barry Thomson (1954)
Doctor

Adam Thorpe
Robert Gerringer (1972–1973)
Robert Milli (1973–1981; 1989; 1994)

Roger Thorpe (deceased)
Michael Zaslow (1971–1980; 1989–1997)
Dennis Parlato (1997–1998)

Carrie Todd
Jane Elliot (1981–1982)

Joe Turino
Joseph Campanella (1959–1960)

Clay Tynan
Giancarlo Esposito (1982–1983)

Helen Tynan
Micki Grant (1982–1984)

U

V

Christine Valere
Ariana Chase (1986–1987)

Paul Valere
Robin Ward (1987)

Missy Van Houten
Cathy Lynn Yonek (1993)

Eric Van Gelder
Larry Gates (1977–1978)

David Vested
Peter D. Greene (1970–1971)
Dan Hamilton (1971–1972)

Kit Vested
Nancy Addison (1969–1974)

Jack Vice
Sean Patrick Reilly (2004)

Francesca Vizzini
Nadia Capone (1991)

Dorie Von Halkein
Kim Fertman (1985–1986)

India Von Halkein
Mary Kay Adams (1984–1987; 1990; 1998–1999; 2002; 2005)

Peter Vreeland
Roscoe Born (2001)

W

Charlotte Waring (A.K.A. Tracy Delmar Fletcher)
Victoria Wyndham (1967–1971)
Felice Camargo (1969)
Dorrie Kavanaugh (1970)
Melinda O. Fee (1971–1973)

Ben Warren (deceased)
Hunt Block (1997–1999)

Joe Werner
Ben Hayes (1966–1967)
Ed Zimmermann (1967–1972)
Anthony Call (1972–1976)
Doctor

Tim "T.J." Werner
T.J. Hargrave (1974–1976)
Kevin Bacon (1980–1981)
Christopher Marcantel (1981–1982)

Lucille Wexler
Rita Lloyd (1980–1981)

Peter Wexler
Michael Durrell (1968–1971)

Charlotte Wheaton
Barbara Garrick (1985)

Griffin Williams
Geoffrey C. Ewing (1995–1998)

Marcus Williams
Kevin Mambo (1995–1998)

Cassie Layne Winslow
Laura Wright (1997–2005)
Nicole Forrester (2005–2008)

Edmund Winslow
David Andrew Macdonald (1999–2005; 2008–2009)

Richard Winslow
Bradley Cole (1999–2002)

Tammy Winslow (deceased)
Katie Sagona (1997–2002)
Stephanie Gatschet (2002–2007)

Will Winslow
Scott and Zachary Benes (2001–2005)
Seamus Davey-Fitzpatrick (2007–2008)

Kirk Winters
James Horan (1980–1981)
Detective.

Cass Winthrop
Stephen Schnetzer (2002)

Miss Emma Witherspoon
Maureen O'Sullivan (1984)

Ashlee Wolfe
Caitlin Van Zandt (2006–2009)

Doris Wolfe
Orlagh Cassidy (1999–2009)

Carl Wyatt
Gerald S. O'Laughlin (1965)
Lieutenant

Y

Anita Ybarra
Carla Pinza (1988–1989)

John Young
Khin-Kyaw Maung (1984)

Louisa Young
Holly Marie Combs (1990)

Yves
Reid Mihalko (2001)

Z

Zamana
Adolph Ceasar (1984)

Zamir
Cory Nichols (2009)

Ziggy
Cal Robertson (2007)

Zoe
Christy Meyers (2005)

References

Guiding Light
 
Guiding Light